E24 may refer to:
 HMS E24, a Royal Navy submarine
 Nimzo-Indian Defense, Encyclopaedia of Chess Openings code
 European route E24, a road in Great Britain between Birmingham and Ipswich 
 The chassis designation for the Nissan Caravan van between 1988 and 1997
 E24 series of preferred numbers
 E24 Näringsliv, a Swedish online business newspaper
 E24 Næringsliv, a Norwegian online business newspaper
 A daily British television programme about news from the entertainment industry, shown on BBC News
 BMW E24, a car produced between 1976 and 1989
 E24 (TV channel), an Indian cable television and satellite network
 Keinawa Expressway, route E24 in Japan